Trouble at Midnight is a 1937 American action film directed by Ford Beebe, written by Maurice Geraghty and Ford Beebe, and starring Noah Beery Jr., Kay Hughes, Larry J. Blake, Bernadene Hayes, Louis Mason and Earl Dwire. It was released on October 17, 1937, by Universal Pictures.

Plot

Cast
Noah Beery Jr. as Kirk Cameron
Kay Hughes as Catherine Benson 
Larry J. Blake as Tony Michaels 
Bernadene Hayes as Marion
Louis Mason as Elmer
Earl Dwire as Henry Goff
Charles Halton as Everett Benson
Frank Melton as Frank Cordeen
Henry Hunter as Dick Cameron
George Humbert as Nick
Harlan Briggs as Sheriff
Guy Edward Hearn as DeHoff
Harry C. Bradley as Doctor

References

External links
 

1937 films
American action films
1930s action films
Universal Pictures films
Films directed by Ford Beebe
American black-and-white films
1930s English-language films
1930s American films